Vinkivtsi is an urban-type settlement in Khmelnytskyi Raion, Khmelnytskyi Oblast in western Ukraine. It hosts the administration of Vinkivtsi settlement hromada, one of the hromadas of Ukraine. The settlement's population was 6,937 as of the 2001 Ukrainian Census and 

The settlement was first founded in 1493. In 1927, it was renamed Zatonsk in honor of Volodymyr Zatonsky, a member of the Academy of Sciences of the Ukrainian SSR. It received the status of an urban-type settlement in 1957.

Until 18 July 2020, Vinkivtsi was the administrative center of Vinkivtsi Raion. The raion was abolished in July 2020 as part of the administrative reform of Ukraine, which reduced the number of raions of Khmelnytskyi Oblast to three. The area of Vinkivtsi Raion was merged into Khmelnytskyi Raion.

References

Urban-type settlements in Khmelnytskyi Raion
Populated places established in the 1490s
Ushitsky Uyezd